Greenyard Maaseik is a Belgian professional men's volleyball club from the city of Maaseik. They compete in the Euro Millions Volley League.

Honours

Domestic
 Belgian Championship
Winners (16): 1990–91, 1994–95, 1995–96, 1996–97, 1997–98, 1998–99, 2000–01, 2001–02, 2002–03, 2003–04, 2007–08, 2008–09, 2010–11, 2011–12, 2017–18, 2018–19

 Belgian Cup
Winners (14): 1985–86, 1990–91, 1996–97, 1997–98, 1998–99, 2000–01, 2001–02, 2002–03, 2003–04, 2006–07, 2007–08, 2008–09, 2009–10, 2011–12

 Belgian SuperCup
Winners (14): 1995–96, 1996–97, 1997–98, 1998–99, 1999–2000, 2001–02, 2002–03, 2003–04, 2006–07, 2008–09, 2009–10, 2011–12, 2012–13, 2016–17

International
 CEV European Champions Cup
Silver (2): 1996–97, 1998–99

 CEV Cup
Silver (1): 2007–08

History

Mavoc Maaseik, the first name of the club, was founded in 1960 and grew out of the school "Het Heilig Kruis College Maaseik". 
In '75 -'76 the name Mavoc changed into D & V Motors as headsponsor and the club celebrated the promotion to the highest division in Belgium (ere-divisie). Since '76 the team is playing in the highest division (ere-divisie) and started a great career. In '85 -'86 Mr. Emile De Bruyn, general-director of SCANA-NOLIKO and Mathi Raedschelders, president, gave an extra input to the team. NOLIKO became head-sponsor and with the coach Jos Klaps, Noliko won the Cup and in '85 - '86 NOLIKO Maaseik played its first European match against SC Leipzig (01.11.86). 
In '90 -'91 our club became for the first time in its history "Champion of Belgium" and won for the second time the Cup; the coach was Bert Goedkoop. Eddy Evens, player of the year became Technical Director and was with Mr. De Bruyn founder of the businessclub AGORA "Zakenvrienden Noliko Maaseik". 
A new building was built with a full-time secretary and a high culinary restaurant. In '93-'94 and '94-'95 the quarter final of the CEV-cup was reached and lost against Padova (Ita) and Nizhnevartovsk (Rus). Since the introduction of the Champions League in 1996, it is the only team in Europe, that took part to the first 5 editions. With head-coach Anders Kristiansson they made the following European results: '96 (5th) - '97 (2nd), lost final against Modena (Ita). '98 (4th) - '99 (2nd) final lost against Treviso (Ita) in Almeria. '00 (3rd), won the small final against Vienna (Aus) in Treviso. Today all the players and coaches are professionals and the organisation is done by a full-time manager with his assistant and many people who work as volunteers. Today the club is built on: NOLIKO Maaseik: Team in the Belgian Championship (ere-divisie).In April 2002 Scana Noliko and the volleyballclub made a new agreement for another two years contract. General Director Dominique Stinckens and the President of the Club Mathi Raedschelders signed a sponsor-contract for the 18th and 19th season since 1985 ! This is unique in the Belgian Sports World.
AGORA: Businessclub founded in 1992 with administration and restaurant. 
NOLIKO youth: 200 boys and girls playing along their level and motivation. 
Regio-Club: Founded in 1996 as a collaboration for youthplayers with 38 clubs of the province. 
FORTIS-tornooi: International tournament for 6 teams since 1989. 
Beach-volley: 8 permanent beachvolleybalcourts behind the sporthall since 1995.

References

External links
 Official website 
 Team profile at Volleybox.net

Belgian volleyball clubs
Volleyball clubs established in 1960
1960 establishments in Belgium